Acroncosa similella is a species of snout moth in the genus Acroncosa. It was described by William Barnes and James Halliday McDunnough in 1917. It is found in the US state of California.

References

Moths described in 1917
Phycitinae
Moths of North America